Woman is the third studio album by the French electronic music duo Justice, released on 18 November 2016 by Ed Banger Records and Because Music.

Overview
Four singles were issued from the LP which are "Safe and Sound", "Randy", "Alakazam !", and "Fire". Xavier de Rosnay described the album as being "like if you're in the car with your best friend and your lover and your kids."

Critical reception

Heather Phares of AllMusic called Woman "an enjoyable album" that's "built on layers of fondly remembered vintage funk and disco, pre-EDM French Touch, and Gaspard Augé and Xavier de Rosnay's own work." Danny Wright of DIY noted that the LP sees Justice "adding some fierce slap to the bass, bringing psychedelic disco to the prog and metal dance mix" with a "sound is still huge, still bludgeoningly and pleasingly direct."

Track listing 
All tracks are written by Gaspard Augé and Xavier de Rosnay, except where noted.

Notes
 "Pleasure" features lead vocals from Morgan Phalen
 "Fire" features lead vocals from Romuald Lauverjon
 "Stop" features lead vocals from Johnny Blake
 "Randy" features vocals from Morgan Phalen
 "Love S.O.S." features vocals from Romuald Lauverjon

Charts

Weekly charts

Year-end charts

References

External links

2016 albums
Ed Banger Records albums
Justice (band) albums